Moana Stadium was a stadium in Reno, Nevada.  It was primarily used for baseball. Teams that called the stadium home included the Reno Silver Sox, the Reno Blackjacks, Reno Padres and Reno Chukars.  The ballpark had a capacity of 4,000 people.  Moana Stadium was part of a city sports park. The stadium was demolished in 2012 to make room for a new city pool and athletic fields on the site.

History
Hosted the Reno Oilers in the 1955 season which was the first professional team to use the stadium for their home field.

The Reno Silver Sox used the stadium as their home field for the first time in 1947–1951.  Various incarnations of the team played in the stadium again in 1955–1964, 1966–1981, 1988–1992, and 2006-2008.

The Triple-A Tucson Sidewinders relocated to Reno in 2009 to become the Reno Aces. The city collaborated to build a new stadium in downtown Reno which would host the Aces and other city and state events. The presence of the new stadium, Greater Nevada Field, rendered Moana Stadium useless. The independent Reno Astros used the stadium in 2009, but the stadium was vacant for three years following that season.  In 2011, plans were drawn up to demolish the stadium and nearby Moana Pool to construct several public soccer fields and a new city pool and aquatics center. Parts of the stadium were auctioned off to the public in April, 2012. The demolition of Moana Stadium was completed over a two-day stretch in July, 2012.

References

Sports venues in Reno, Nevada
Minor league baseball venues
Demolished buildings and structures in Nevada
Defunct baseball venues in the United States
Defunct minor league baseball venues
Sports venues demolished in 2012